"Sì" ("Yes") is the name of the  entry to the Eurovision Song Contest 1974, which finished second behind the  entry "Waterloo" sung by ABBA.

Background
The lyrics and musics were written by Mario Panzeri, Daniele Pace,  and Corrado Conti. It was sung in Italian by Gigliola Cinquetti.

During the preview programmes, Cinquetti sang the song alone in a dark room. The music video was broadcast in black and white as RAI did not move to full color broadcasts until 1977. On the contest night, Cinquetti performed the ballad in a blue dress, accompanied by an orchestra and four teenage female backup singers, dressed in light yellow blouses and autumnal floral skirts. The song is sung in the first person where she reflects and describes her love for a man, and the exhilaration she feels when she finally says "yes" to him, which signifies that they can start the rest of their lives together. Throughout the song, the word "sì" is repeated sixteen times.

It was the seventeenth and final song of the evening, following 's "E depois do adeus" which would later be used as a signal in Portugal to begin the Carnation Revolution.

Under the scoring system of the time, each country had ten jurors, each of whom allocated one point to the song which they deemed to be the best.
It was Italy's second best result to date, with Cinquetti having won the contest with "Non ho l'età" .

Cinquetti later recorded versions in English ("Go (Before You Break My Heart)"), French ("Lui"), German ("Ja") and Spanish ("Sí"), which were released across Europe. A Finnish rendering, "Niin", was recorded by Lea Laven and became a Top Ten hit in Finland.

Censorship of song in 1974
The live telecast of the song was banned in her home country by the Italian national broadcaster RAI as the event partially coincided with the campaigning for the 1974 Italian referendum on divorce which was held a month later in May.

RAI censored the song due to concerns the name and lyrics of the song (which constantly repeated the word "SI") could be accused of being a subliminal message and a form of propaganda to influence the Italian voting public to vote "YES" in the referendum. The song remained censored on most Italian state TV and radio stations for over a month. As a consequence, the song failed to enter to Top 40 chart in Italy, and still remains one of the lesser known Eurovision entries in the country. As opposed to "Non ho l'età", "Sì" also failed to make a significant impact on the charts in Continental Europe and Scandinavia – with one notable exception: 
the English version "Go (Before You Break My Heart)" reached eighth position in the British charts in June 1974 (with the Spanish version on the B-side), making it one of the very few non-winning Eurovision entries to become a commercial success in the UK.

Charts

See also
Eurovision Song Contest 1974
Italy in the Eurovision Song Contest
Eurovision Song Contest

References

External links
Lyrics

Eurovision songs of Italy
Songs written by Mario Panzeri
Eurovision songs of 1974
Songs written by Daniele Pace
Gigliola Cinquetti songs
Censorship of music